Alisha Rai is a Nepalese film actress, model and dancer. She rose to fame from her dance performance in the Nepalese movie Loot 2 (2017). Before then, Alisha had also acted in the leading role of a Kiranti language movie entitled Binayo.

In addition to acting in movies, Alisha started her career from music videos and different short comedy videos/sketch comedy videos at the Nepali YouTube channel Ur StyleTV.

Personal life 
Alisha Rai was born on January 5, 1996, in Kathmandu, Nepal. She started her career by working on music videos and shorts films. Dancing from childhood in events and school programs led to her the success she is now.

Career

Loot 2 success (2017 – present) 
Rai's successful film named Loot 2 was released in 2017 in the film she played as Sundari who is a dancer after the film's song was released in YouTube which helped boost her fame.

In the year 2014 she had played a leading role in the Kirati cultural movie "Binayo".

Selected filmography 
 Binayo (2014) 
 Loot 2 (2017) as Sundari

References 

Living people
1996 births
21st-century Nepalese actresses
Nepalese female models
Actors from Kathmandu
Nepalese female dancers
20th-century Nepalese dancers
21st-century Nepalese dancers
Rai people